The Ritual Macabre is the sixth release by the black metal band Watain. It is their second live album. The album was released in 2001 on Sakreligious Warfare Productions and was limited to 666 copies. "Transilvanian Hunger" is a cover of Darkthrone's song from the album of the same name.

Track listing

References

Watain albums
2001 live albums